Fabrizio Giovanardi (born 14 December 1966 in Sassuolo) is an Italian racing driver. During his career he has won ten touring car titles, including European and British crowns making him the most successful touring car driver worldwide. He has spent the majority of his career racing for Alfa Romeo and Vauxhall.

Career

Formula Three
After winning both the Italian and World Formula C karting titles for 125cc karts in 1986, Giovanardi stepped up to the Italian Formula Three Championship in 1987, driving a Reynard 873 powered by Alfa Romeo for PreMa Racing, where he scored a podium en route to thirteenth position in the championship. He stayed in the series in 1988, where he secured two wins at Vallelunga and Enna-Pergusa and finished third overall in the championship, a point behind runner-up Mauro Martini and two points behind season champion Emanuele Naspetti. He returned to the series in 1990, competing in a single round.

Formula 3000
In 1989, Giovanardi switched to International Formula 3000 to compete with First Racing and won the race at Vallelunga. Those were his only points however, as he ended up tenth in the final championship standings; failing to qualify for races at Silverstone, Brands Hatch and Le Mans. He continued in the series in 1990 with First Racing, and again ended up tenth in the championship with a best result of second place at Pau. 1991 was his final season, and finished in a three-way tie for eleventh place.

Super Touring Cars
Giovanardi dabbled into the Superturismo in the 1991 season, competing in a Peugeot 405. He took five Class S2 victories which set him up for a full campaign in the 1992 season. In his first full season, he was champion in the S2 class taking eight race wins and being crowned champion, his first touring car title. He moved into the main class of the championship with Peugeot in 1993, finishing in the top three overall twice (second in 1993 and third in 1994), and winning five races before moving to Nordauto Engineering Alfa Romeo in 1995. In his début season with Alfa, Giovanardi again finished in third place, beating his team-mate Antonio Tamburini in a tie. He also contested one round of the Deutsche Tourenwagen Meisterschaft at the Norisring, driving an Alfa Romeo 155 for the factory Alfa Corse team.

In 1996 he continued to race in Superturismo and he also participated to some rounds of CET always with Nordauto Engineering. He finished fifth in Italy, and one place lower in Spain, taking five wins over the two series. In 1997 he continued in both championship Superturismo and CET driving for the last time Alfa Romeo 155 Ts. He won all four races of CET before that serie was cancelled due to lack of cars and he finished second in Superturismo with five victories behind Naspetti. He got the better of Naspetti in 1998, dominating the Italian championship in the new Alfa Romeo 156 with nine victories and eighteen podium on twenty races. Giovanardi and team-mate Nicola Larini made a guest appearance in the STW at the Norisring, where they both finished outside the top ten placings in both races.

He became again Italian champion in 1999, again beating his BMW rival Naspetti in a thrilling last race in Vallelunga; Giovanardi's advantage at the end of the season was only fourteen points after ten rounds. Giovanardi and Larini made a return to the STW at the series' Italian round at Misano, and the Alfa drivers finished 1–2 in the sprint race before both retired in the feature race. The Superturismo was promoted to become the Euro STC in 2000, and again Giovanardi won the title with Nordauto. Consistency was the key to become again champion in the new European Championship Euro STC in 2001, winning just three races and ten podium.

Giovanardi also got his first Formula One test as a test driver for Ferrari on February 1 in 2001, replacing the injured Luca Badoer, who crashed heavily several weeks before. He was the official test driver of the team until September of that year, when Badoer healed and returned to his testing duties.

European/World Touring Car Championship

In 2002, the European Touring Car Championship returned as a complete entity using the Super 2000 regulations. The regulation change did not hinder Giovanardi as he won a touring car title for the fifth successive season, again at the wheel of an Alfa Romeo. However, he switched to a Ravaglia Motorsport-run BMW for the 2003 season, but struggled with the rear-wheel-drive car taking only three podiums en route to ninth in the championship. Unsurprisingly, Giovanardi returned to the wheel of an Alfa in 2004 as part of a four-car team by Autodelta, the new name for Nordauto. Giovanardi took a single victory at Valencia as he finished sixth in the championship, finishing behind team-mate Gabriele Tarquini, the first such occasion of Giovanardi being beaten by a team-mate.

With the European series becoming the World Touring Car Championship in 2005 – the first such championship season since 1987 – Giovanardi was part of the Alfa factory outfit, alongside Tarquini, James Thompson and Augusto Farfus, with André Couto joining the quartet at his home round in Macau. Giovanardi took a season-high four victories, as he finished as the highest-placed Alfa Romeo driver in the championship, finishing behind the BMWs of champion Andy Priaulx and Dirk Müller.  His final appearance in the series to date came in 2006, when he replaced Pierre-Yves Corthals in Curitiba, Brazil and joined Corthals in Macau for JAS Motorsport; taking a best result of fourth in the opening Macau race.

In 2011, Giovanardi won the European Touring Car Cup at the Salzburgring in Austria. He clinched Hartmann Racing's third consecutive European Touring Car Cup, in a Honda Accord.

British Touring Car Championship

VX Racing/Triple Eight (2006–2010)

With Alfa Romeo pulling out of the WTCC, Giovanardi began searching for a replacement ride for the 2006 season. In late 2005 Giovanardi tested a Vauxhall Astra Sport Hatch for the Triple Eight BTCC team at Pembrey in Wales. The team duly signed him, and Tom Chilton up to drive for the team in 2006. Gavin Smith would later join the team, making it a three-car Vauxhall effort.

It was a testing year for the team and Giovanardi, as he came close to a first win at Donington Park before a final-corner collision with West Surrey Racing's Colin Turkington. Giovanardi led into the chicane before an outbraking move by Turkington put him alongside at the apex. Both cut the chicane after the collision, and Turkington got to the line first, taking his second win of the season. Ultimately, his first win – and Vauxhall's 100th in the British Touring Car Championship – came at Knockhill. Fittingly, he was congratulated on live TV by John Cleland, the man who took Vauxhall's first win. He then secured a second win in the series at Brands Hatch; finishing his first BTCC campaign in fifth position, passing James Thompson by a single point at the final meeting of the season at Silverstone. Giovanardi and Chilton both remained with the team into the 2007 season, driving the team's new Vauxhall Vectra in the championship.

The Vectra seemed to suit the driving style of Giovanardi better than his young team-mate, with Giovanardi taking ten wins to Chilton's tally of none. Indeed, Giovanardi was involved in a season-long championship battle with SEAT Sport's Jason Plato, with Plato leading 265-256 into the final round, having not finished outside the top eight positions in the first 27 rounds of the championship. In the first two races at Thruxton, Giovanardi led Plato home and thus Plato held a one-point lead going into the final race. With the top seven places reversed on the grid, Plato started sixth and Giovanardi seventh; but it was the Italian who made the quicker progress through the pack, and with his second place compared to Plato's fourth, Giovanardi claimed his first BTCC title by three points.

In 2008, Chilton left for Team Dynamics, and thus Giovanardi was joined by new team-mates Matt Neal (joining from Dynamics) and Tom Onslow-Cole (joining from West Surrey Racing) in a three-car team. Giovanardi was the driver to beat, and sealed the title convincingly at Brands Hatch, with two races to spare; clinching the title with a non-scoring fourteenth position, due to the result of rival Plato (fifth), he could no longer be caught in the title race. Until the first race at Brands, Giovanardi had been on a run of 39 consecutive points finishes which had begun at round 19 of the 2007 season, at Snetterton in late July. He failed to score a top ten finish in the entire round, after failing to start in the second race and finishing eleventh in the final race. His only point came from the fastest lap of the final race. Plato finished third in the championship, as Mat Jackson overhauled his points tally after a good final weekend of the season.

Giovanardi and Neal were joined at VX Racing by Andrew Jordan for the 2009 season, which would be the final season of manufacturer effort by Vauxhall. Vauxhall cited the economic downturn as the main reason for pulling out at the end of the season. Giovanardi was once again in the running for the title, alongside Turkington and Plato. Indeed, Giovanardi trailed Turkington by thirteen points heading to the final round of the season, held on the Grand Prix circuit at Brands Hatch. By the final race of the afternoon, a three-way title battle was still the situation, as Turkington had 262 points, Giovanardi 258 and Plato 254 – having won the first two races – with a maximum of seventeen points available. A titanic battle for the lead ensued and was not settled until the final lap of the race. Plato won the race becoming the only second driver to win all three races at a BTCC meeting, with Turkington finishing second to win his first title. Giovanardi finished in fourth position, and thus finished third in the championship standings.

Giovanardi struggled to find a top-line drive for the 2010 season, but returned to the BTCC at the 2010 season-opening round at Thruxton. He drove the #888 Vauxhall Vectra for Triple Eight, partnering 2009 Clio Cup UK champion Phil Glew, who made his BTCC début at the meeting. He won the first two races of the season before taking a fifth-place finish in race three to secure a seven-point lead from Jason Plato in the championship. The team had hoped to run Giovanardi for the remainder of the season, but he was replaced by James Nash ahead of the second round at Rockingham due to sponsor Uniq pulling out.

Instead, Giovanardi found a temporary home in the Italian-based Superstars Series, driving N.Technology's brand new Porsche Panamera S, and won a race on the car's début at Mugello. Giovanardi claimed three wins in succession at Paul Ricard and Vallelunga enabling him to finish sixth in the series' Italian championship, while he lies fifth in the international points, with one round left.

Airwaves Racing (2014)

In February 2014, Giovanardi was confirmed as Airwaves Racing's first driver for the 2014 British Touring Car Championship season in a Ford Focus ST Mk.III. Giovanardi struggled to find the sweet spot in the new NGTC machinery and finished 13th overall with a solitary podium at Thruxton.

V8 Supercars
Giovanardi drove with Marc Hynes in the two main endurance races of the 2008 V8 Supercar Championship Series, the L&H 500 at Phillip Island and the Supercheap Auto Bathurst 1000 at Mount Panorama. The two drivers were recruited by Triple Eight Race Engineering to pilot the #88 car while regular drivers Jamie Whincup and Craig Lowndes teamed up in Lowndes' usual #888 car. At Phillip Island, Giovanardi and Hynes finished 17th, a lap down on winners Garth Tander and Mark Skaife and at Bathurst, the pair finished 15th – two laps down on team-mates (and race winners) Lowndes and Whincup. In 2010, Giovanardi will be driving for Britek Motorsport in the Armor All Gold Coast 600, sharing the team's Holden Commodore with Karl Reindler. In 2011, it was announced that Giovanardi would, once again, be driving for Britek Motorsport in the Armor All Gold Coast 600 with Karl Reindler.

Italian Touring Car Championship 2017 (Racing Return).

Giovanardi returned to Touring Car Racing for the first time in 3 Years for a guest appearance in the Italian Touring Car Championship round at Vallelunga. He qualified 6th but after a poor start dropped back to 10th. Despite not racing in almost three years Giovanardi fought his way back up to 4th in the race.

World Touring Car Cup (WTCR)

Giovanardi was confirmed as returning to regular touring car racing in 2018 at the wheel of an Alfa Romeo Giulietta in the FIA World Touring Car Cup.

Racing record

Career summary

Complete International Formula 3000 results
(key) (Races in bold indicate pole position) (Races in italics indicate fastest lap)

Complete Deutsche Tourenwagen Meisterschaft results
(key) (Races in bold indicate pole position) (Races in italics indicate fastest lap)

Complete Italian Touring Car Championship results

Complete European Touring Car Championship results
(key) (Races in bold indicate pole position) (Races in italics indicate fastest lap)

† — Did not finish the race, but was classified as he completed over 90% of the race distance.

Complete World Touring Car Championship results
(key) (Races in bold indicate pole position) (Races in italics indicate fastest lap)

† — Did not finish the race, but was classified as he completed over 90% of the race distance.

Complete British Touring Car Championship results
(key) (Races in bold indicate pole position - 1 point awarded just in first race) (Races in italics indicate fastest lap - 1 point awarded all races) (* signifies that driver lead race for at least one lap - 1 point awarded all races)

* Season still in progress.

Complete V8 Supercar Championship results

+ Not Eligible for points

Complete International Superstars Series results
(key) (Races in bold indicate pole position) (Races in italics indicate fastest lap)

Complete World Touring Car Cup results
(key) (Races in bold indicate pole position) (Races in italics indicate fastest lap)

† Driver did not finish the race, but was classified as he completed over 90% of the race distance.

Complete TCR Europe Touring Car Series results
(key) (Races in bold indicate pole position) (Races in italics indicate fastest lap)

Personal life
Giovanardi is married to Patrizia and has one son, Luca. Away from racing he works for his father's business and has a passion for house renovation and flying light aircraft.

References

External links
 
 

1966 births
Living people
People from Sassuolo
Italian racing drivers
British Touring Car Championship drivers
British Touring Car Championship Champions
World Touring Car Championship drivers
Italian Formula Three Championship drivers
TC 2000 Championship drivers
International Formula 3000 drivers
Supercars Championship drivers
Superstars Series drivers
European Touring Car Championship drivers
European Touring Car Cup drivers
World Touring Car Cup drivers
Sportspeople from the Province of Modena
Karting World Championship drivers
BMW M drivers
Prema Powerteam drivers
Nürburgring 24 Hours drivers
TCR Europe Touring Car Series drivers